NGC 4340 is a double-barred lenticular galaxy located about 55 million light-years away in the constellation of Coma Berenices. NGC 4340 was discovered by astronomer William Herschel on March 21, 1784. NGC 4340 is a member of the Virgo Cluster. NGC 4340 is generally thought to be in a pair with the galaxy NGC 4350.

Physical characteristics
NGC 4340 has a small inner bar embedded in a luminous stellar nuclear ring. Even though the ring is luminous, there are no star-forming regions. Instead, the ring is made of mostly old stars in a gas-poor environment. The color of the ring is the same as the color of the surrounding bulge suggesting that it is probably an old, “fossil” remnant of an earlier episode of star-formation. Crossing the inner ring, there is a larger primary bar with ansae at the ends. Careful inspection shows that the two bars are slightly misaligned, which suggests they may be independently rotating. The larger primary bar connects to another ring that surrounds the central regions of the galaxy.

SN1977A
On January 27, 1977 a supernova of an unknown type was discovered in NGC 4340.

See also 
 List of NGC objects (4001–5000)

References

External links 

Barred lenticular galaxies
Coma Berenices
4340
Virgo Cluster
40245
7467
Astronomical objects discovered in 1784